The American Party of Labor is an American anti-revisionist Marxist–Leninist communist party founded in 2008. The party aims to establish a dictatorship of the proletariat and a commonly owned publicly planned economy for their future goal of a communist society in the United States.

History 
The American Party of Labor traces its origin to the activities of the former leader of the Communist Party USA, William Z. Foster, the American communist Jack Shulman, and the British Marxist–Leninist Bill Bland. Members of the American Party of Labor had previously been active in Alliance Marxist–Leninist and International Struggle Marxist–Leninist, two organizations founded by Shulman and Bland. The party sees itself as continuing the work of Foster, Shulman, and Bland.

The APL maintains friendly relations with many foreign communist parties in the International Conference of Marxist–Leninist Parties and Organizations. In November 2018, the XXIV Plenary of the International Conference of Marxist–Leninist Parties and Organizations granted the APL Observer status in that organization.

Activities 
The APL's main lines of activity include:

 Maintaining Community solidarity projects such as Red Aid, through which the party provides the impoverished with food, clothing,  and other forms of social assistance.
 Organizing and participating in protests.
 Supporting anti-war coalitions such as the "Hands Off Venezuela - N.J." coalition, which calls for an end to the risk of U.S. intervention in Venezuela, signing the 2016 U.S. Hands Off Syria Coalition unity statement, and supporting the 2019 march on wall street.

Publications 
The current party newspaper, The Red Phoenix, publishes opinionated articles on political-economic issues, theoretical and historical topics, and on what they view as contemporary issues of the working class. 

From 2010–2012, the American Party of Labor published the Revolutionary Spirit, a Marxist-Leninist theoretical journal, which contained writings of Marxist classics, translations of contemporary Marxist-Leninist theory, and original essays.

Political platform 
The main political points of the American Party of Labor include:

Economic and social 
 Expropriation of all means of production to the working-class through socialist state ownership.
 Worker's rights to organize, benefits, and free speech in the workplace.
 A universal basic income
 Abolishing the pornography industry and copyright laws
 State funding for construction of public housing
 Full Abortion Rights
 Establishing a national healthcare system
 Abolishing private education 
Domestic policy 
 An end to all discrimination on the basis of race, religion,and sexual orientation.
 Abolition of all emergency powers, mass surveillance programs, the Patriot Act, the Espionage Act, the Department of Homeland Security and the National Security Agency.
 Ending deportations and amnesty for undocumented workers and the release of all political prisoners.
 The right of self-determination for all nations within the borders of the U.S., up to and including the right of secession.
 Ending practices such as convict labor and solitary confinement.

Foreign policy 
 A withdrawal from NAFTA, DR-CAFTA, and all other free trade agreements alongside withdrawal from the International Monetary Fund, World Bank, World Trade Organization, and NATO. 
 An ending the deployment of military forces on the U.S.-Mexican border, the U.S. embargo on Cuba, the ownership of Guantanamo Bay, and the deployment of forces on the Korean peninsula.
 The Cessation of military and financial aid to the governments of the Philippines, Colombia, and Israel, while establishing friendly relationships with countries like Cuba, Iran, Syria, Venezuela, and signing a peace treaty with the DPRK.

References

Further reading 
 Vaughn, Victor. "Category Archives: American Party of Labor" series, Espresso Stalinist
 Foster, William Z. History of the Communist Party of the United States. International Publishers, New York. January 1, 1952.
 Revolutionary Spirit. Theoretical Journal of the American Party of Labor.

External links 

 The Red Phoenix

Communism in the United States
William Z. Foster
Anti-revisionist organizations
Stalinist parties
Hoxhaist parties in the United States
International Conference of Marxist–Leninist Parties and Organizations (Unity & Struggle)
Communist parties in the United States
Political parties established in 2008
Political parties in the United States
Hoxhaist parties